The 2022 Chilean national plebiscite was held on 4 September 2022, in order to determine whether the public agreed with the text of a new Political Constitution of the Republic drawn up by the Constitutional Convention. It was commonly referred to as the "exit plebiscite" (plebiscito de salida).

The proposed constitution, which had faced "intense criticism that it was too long, too left-wing and too radical", was rejected by a margin of 62% to 38%.

Election date

According to the itinerary originally proposed for the constituent process, it was estimated that the plebiscite to approve or reject the text of the new Constitution would take place in September 2021, if the Constitutional Convention met its term of nine months and did not request the three-month extension, or in March 2022, if it requested such an extension. In addition, the exit plebiscite could not be held 60 days before or after another election, nor could it be held in January or February, which would have placed it on the first Sunday in March if an extension were requested.

As a result of the postponement of the first plebiscite to 25 October 2020 due to the COVID-19 pandemic, the date of the exit plebiscite was also modified. It was projected to take place during the third quarter of 2022, in September at the latest. In April 2022, it was announced that the referendum would be held on 4 September.

Format
Article 142 of the 1980 Political Constitution of the Republic of Chile indicates the text of the ballot in the plebiscite:

There is no contingency plan currently in place as to what will happen if the new constitution is rejected. Chilean human rights lawyer Dinka Benítez states that "given that 80 percent of those who voted in the plebiscite want a new constitution, it seems that Chile … will necessarily have to find a way to have a new constitution" in some form, and that a "reject" vote would not necessarily be a death knell for constitutional reform.

New Political Constitution of the Republic

Party positions

Opinion polls 
The tables below list opinion polling results in reverse chronological order, showing the most recent first and using the dates when the survey fieldwork was done, as opposed to the date of publication. Where the fieldwork dates are unknown, the date of publication is given instead. The highest percentage figure in each polling survey is displayed with its background shaded in the leading option's color. The "Lead" column on the right shows the percentage-point difference between the options in a poll.

Voting intention estimates 

The table below lists weighted voting intention estimates. Refusals are generally excluded from the party vote percentages, while question wording and the treatment of "don't know" responses and those not intending to vote may vary between polling organizations.

Voting preferences 
The table below lists raw, unweighted voting preferences.

Results

Analysis
Chileans' views on the new constitution changed throughout the process of the Constitutional Convention. When the Constitutional Convention started meeting in August 2021, participants in a national poll were asked if they believed that the new constitution resulting from the process would help solve Chile's problems, have no effect, or worse the current situation, 49% said it would have a positive effect, and only 15% said it would have a negative effect. However by May 2022, only 36% of Chileans said that they believed the new constitution would have a positive effect. In a study carried out by the independent think tank Espacio Público-IPSOS in July 2022, 38% of respondents believed that the new constitution would bring about several negative changes for the country, while only 23% believed it would bring positive changes.

Doubts about the representativeness of the Constitutional Convention's members may have led to its rejection. Respondents to Espacio Público-IPSOS' survey felt the members of the Constitutional Convention were unrepresentative of Chileans as a whole; 59% of respondents said they did not believe the composition of the Constitutional Convention was a good representation of the diversity of Chilean society, and 63% of respondents said they did not feel represented by the Constitutional Convention.

Chileans were also skeptical of particular elements of the new constitution. The indigenous justice system, the plurinational state, and the role of Congress created the most concern. The language of the new constitution declared, "Chile is a Plurinational and Intercultural State that recognizes the coexistence of diverse nations and peoples within the framework of the unity of the State." Regarding an indigenous justice system, the new constitution also declared that "pre-existing indigenous peoples and nations, as well as their members, are entitled to the full exercise of their collective and individual rights by virtue of their self-determination." These new elements generated fears about internal divisions and competing sources of justice to the generally centrist Chilean citizenry. Participants believed that the new constitution would worsen the sale and consumption of drugs, unemployment, poverty and political corruption.

Aftermath
Boric announced a new process for drafting a new constitution, with Al Jazeera writing, "Most Chileans and their politicians have agreed the constitution that dates from the dictatorship must change." Boric called on the heads of all political parties for a meeting on Monday, 5 September, to chart a path forward. As a result of the rejection, the incumbent 1980 Constitution will remain in force, with The Guardian writing that "Chile's future looks decidedly uncertain," and that, "Boric has expressed a willingness to repeat the constitutional process, but the basis for reform is still very much up for debate." Colombian president Gustavo Petro lamented the win of the rejection vote, considering that Chile had decided to "revive Augusto Pinochet".

The Economist considered that "common sense" had led Chileans to reject the proposed constitution, it also called the result a "blow" for the government of Gabriel Boric.

In the aftermath of the plebiscite the internal division that the Christian Democratic Party's official support for the "Approve" option had created resurfaced, with various calls for a renewed leadership, and some calling for the explusion of members who had supported the "Reject" option.

References
Opinion poll sources

Other

Chile
2022 in Chile
Referendums in Chile
September 2022 events in South America
2019–2020 Chilean protests
Presidency of Gabriel Boric